The culture of Meitei civilization evolved over thousands of years, beginning in Ancient Manipur, continuing most notably into Medieval Manipur, while influencing the neighboring states and kingdoms.

Arts

Architecture

The architectural works of the Meitei ethnicity is best known through its Meitei temples as well as ancient buildings including palaces, court halls, offices, entrance gates and so on.

Literature

Meitei literature dates back right from the 15th century BC, during the era of Tangcha Lee La Pakhangpa (Tangja Leela Pakhangba) (1445 BC-1405 BC) in Ancient Manipur. The Puya (Meitei texts) account for most of the accounts for the literary works till Medieval Manipur.

Some of the most prominent Puyas, written in Meitei language (Manipuri language), are given below in alphabetical order:
 Chada Laihui
 Chainarol
 Chothe Thangwai Pakhangba
 Hijan Hirao (Hichan Hilao)
 Khongjomnubi Nongarol
 Khuman Kangleirol
 Khumanlon
 Konthoujam Nongarol
 Leishemlon
 Leithak Leikharol
 Moirang Ningthourol Lambuba
 Ningthourol Lambuba
 Nongban Pombi Luwaoba
 Numit Kappa
 Panthoibi Khongul
 Phouoibi Waron
 Poireiton Khunthok
 Sakok Lamlen
 Sanamahi Laihui
 Tharon (Thalon)
 Toreirol Lambuba
 Tutenglon
 Wakoklon Heelel Thilen Salai Amailon Pukok Puya

Public holidays and festivals

Important days fall in different times of a year according to Meitei calendar. Some are as follows in alphabetical order:
 Cheiraoba (ꯆꯩꯔꯥꯎꯕ)- 1st of Sajibu month
 Emoinu Eratpa (ꯏꯃꯣꯢꯅꯨ ꯏꯔꯥꯠꯄ)- 12th of Wakching month
 Heikru Hidongba (ꯍꯩꯀ꯭ꯔꯨ ꯍꯤꯗꯣꯡꯕ)- 11th of Langban month
 Kwaak Taanba (ꯀ꯭ꯋꯥꯛ ꯇꯥꯟꯕ)- 10th of Mera month
 Mera Chaorel Houba (ꯃꯦꯔꯥ ꯆꯥꯎꯔꯦꯜ ꯍꯧꯕ)- 1st of Mera month
 Mera Hou Chongba (ꯃꯦꯔꯥ ꯍꯧ ꯆꯣꯡꯕ)- 15th of Mera month
 Ningol Chakouba (ꯅꯤꯉꯣꯜ ꯆꯥꯛꯀꯧꯕ)- 2nd of Hiyangei month
 Panthoibi Iratpa (ꯄꯥꯟꯊꯣꯢꯕꯤ ꯏꯔꯥꯠꯄ)
 Sanamahi Ahong Khong Chingba (ꯁꯅꯥꯃꯍꯤ ꯑꯍꯣꯡ ꯈꯣꯡ ꯆꯤꯡꯕ)-
 Yaoshang (ꯌꯥꯎꯁꯪ) -15th of Lamtaa month, Full moon

Religion

Sanamahism, the Meitei religion, has thousands of Meitei deities.The List of figures in Meitei mythology accounts for the characters in Meitei mythology, the receptacle of the Meitei religion.

Lai Haraoba

The "Lai Haraoba" festival is an ancient ritualistic music and dance festival, often performed in order to please the Umang Lais and the Lam Lais, whose pantheons are found scattered in the plains of Manipur still today.

Jagoi, originally spelled as Chatkoi, is the traditional form of dancing, performed by the devotees to please the deities.
Here is a list of the "Chatkoi"s ("Jagoi"s) :

C
 Chukpharon Jagoi
K
 Khamba Thoibi Jagoi
L
 Laiching Jagoi
 Laihou Jagoi
 Leima Jagoi
 Leisem Jagoi
M
 Maibi Jagoi
P
 Panthoibi Jagoi
T
 Thougal Jagoi

Death ceremony 

The Meitei people perform four types of death ceremony since time immemorial. These are:
 Air ceremony (Disposal to the space)
 Earth ceremony (Burial)
 Fire ceremony (Burning)
 Water ceremony (Disposal to the water bodies)

References